Keira Stephens (born 17 March 2003)  is an Australian Paralympic swimmer. At the 2020 Summer Paralympics, she won two bronze medals.

Personal life
Stephens was born on 17 March 2003 in England. She was born missing fingers on her left hand. She comes from Hervey Bay, Queensland and attended Xavier Catholic College.

Swimming career
Stephens started swimming at the Hervey Bay swimming club under coach Paul Jones. She is classified as a S10 swimmer. Her first international competition was the 2018 Pan Pacific Para Swimming Championships, Cairns,  where she won the silver medal in the Women’s 100m Breaststroke SB9.

At the 2019 World Para Swimming Championships, London, Stephens finished fourth in the Women’s 100m Breaststroke SB9, fifth in the Women’s  Medley 34 Points, sixth in the Women’s 200m Individual Medley SM10 and eighth in the Women’s 50m Freestyle S10.

At the 2020 Tokyo Paralympics, Stephens won a bronze medal in the 34pts Women's 4x100m Medley 34 pts. Her team of Ellie Cole, Emily Beecroft, and Isabella Vincent clocked 4:55.70. She also won a bronze medal in the Women's 100 m breaststroke SB9 .She also swam in two other individual events

At the 2022 World Para Swimming Championships, Madeira, Stephens won two medals - gold in Mixed 4 × 100 m medley relay 34 pts and silver in the Women's 100 m Breaststroke SB9.

At the 2022 Commonwealth Games, Birmingham, England, she won the bronze medal in the Women's 200 m individual medley SM10.

Stephens is coached by Nathan Doyle at USC Spartans.

References

External links
 
 
 

2003 births
Living people
Female Paralympic swimmers of Australia
Swimmers at the 2020 Summer Paralympics
Swimmers at the 2022 Commonwealth Games
Medalists at the 2020 Summer Paralympics
Medalists at the World Para Swimming Championships
Paralympic bronze medalists for Australia
Paralympic medalists in swimming
Commonwealth Games bronze medallists for Canada
Commonwealth Games medallists in swimming
Australian female breaststroke swimmers
Australian female medley swimmers
S10-classified Paralympic swimmers
21st-century Australian women
Medallists at the 2022 Commonwealth Games